This is a list of films which have placed number one at the weekend box office in the Philippines during 2009.

Local Film

Notes

References
 Note: Click on the relevant weekend to view specifics.

Philippines
2009
Numb